Pierre Guarin (1678 – December 28, 1729) was a French Hebraist.  He was born at Le Tronquay (Normandy) in 1678. He entered the order of the Benedictines of St. Maur Oct. 21,1696, became subsequently professor of Greek and Hebrew, and died librarian of the abbey of St. Germain des Pros, Dec. 29, 1729.

He had a lively literary controversy with canon Masclef, and wrote Grammatica Hebraica et Chal-deice, etc. (Paris, 1724 8, 2 vols. 4to) : — Lexicon Hebra-icum et Chaldaeobiblicum (Par. 1746, 2 vols. 4to). Guapin only completed this dictionary to Mere inclusively; the following letters were the work of other Benedictines. See Le Cerf, Bibl. Hist. et crit. des Auteurs de la Cony. de St. Maur; Hoefer, Nouv. Biog. Genesis 22:318.

1678 births
1729 deaths
French librarians